The 13 Cold-Blooded Eagles is a 1993 Hong Kong wuxia film produced and directed by Chui Fat and starring Waise Lee and Cynthia Khan. The film is a remake of the 1978 film, The Avenging Eagle.

Plot
During a cold day, the disciples of the Shinshu Religion madly robs a village and hides in the forest. Suddenly, a group of martial arts experts named the "13 Cold-Blooded Eagles" dash in and kill the disciples. After killing them, the 13 Cold-Blooded Eagles return to the Flying Eagle Fort and report to their foster father Yue Xihong (Yen Shi-kwan). Yue then commands them to kill Monster (Chung Fat), leader of Shinshu and take his "Seven Stars Reserpine Technique" manual. The 13 Cold-Blooded Eagles ride up to peak of Hua Mountain where Monster resides. There, the eagles corner Monster at the edge of the cliff while Monster grabs Silver Eagle Qi Yingming (Lau Chi-wai) and falls off the cliff together. Monster dies afterwards while Qi was heavily injured but was rescued by Quihua (Cynthia Khan) and takes him back to her estate. There Quihua nurses Qi back to health and Qi returns to the Flying Eagle Fort while not Quihua his true identity. Yue discovers that the manual is in the hands of Ao Tianheng and he orders his disciples to assassinate Ao and take the manual. Qin thinks that Ao had never committed any evil deeds in the jianghu community and should not victimise an innocent man but he had to obey his mentor. In a hut, the sickly Ao was meditating before three of the eagles come in from the window. Ao's daughter Quihua draws her sword to protect her father and battle the five eagles. Red Eagle (Waise Lee), White Eagle (Wan Seung-lam), Gold Eagle (Anthony Cho) and Black Eagle (Ng Ting-ko) comes to assist. Just as Quihua was losing support, a taoist priest comes to rescue her and strikes Red Eagle into a hole in the ground. While inside the hole, Red Eagle find his father who was struck in by Yue twenty-years ago. Red Eagle's father passes him his inner qigong before dying. The angered Red Eagle runs back to the Flying Eagle Fort where he exposes Yue's evil deeds in front of everyone. However, he was blinded by a condor trained by Yue. Seeing how Red Eagle cannot die in peace, Qi feels very conflicting. Later, Yuen orders Qi to go to Sunflower Island to kill its leader and take the manual away. However, Qi discovers that Quihua is the leader of the island and was reluctant to kill her and decided to let her go but was stop by his fellow eagles. Together with Quihua, Qi kills all the eagles and leaves Sunflower Island with her while being chased by Yue. Desperate to escape, Quihua throws the manual into a rapid river where Yue jumps in. A few days later, Qi and Quihua arrive at the Flying Eagle Fort to seek vengeance on Yue. Qi was heavily wounded after the battle while Quihua uses all of inner qigong to push a boutique of lilies that stab into Yue and kills him. The distressed Qi then holds Quihua's corpse and slowly walks up the hill while facing the sun.

Cast
Waise Lee as Shima Yufeng (Red Eagle)
Cynthia Khan as Quihua
Wan Seung-lam as White Eagle
Lau Chi-wai as Qi Yingming (Silver Eagle)
Anthony Cho as Gold Eagle
Ng Ting-ko as Black Eagle
Yen Shi-kwan as Yue Xihong
Chung Fat as Shinshu Monster
Tin Ching

Critical reception
Kung Fu Cinema rated the film 4.5 out of 5 stars and gave a relatively positive review, writing "With decent production values and some gorgeous outdoor backdrops, The 13 Cold-Blooded Eagles is visually appealing. Add to that a solid story and plenty of exciting wirework action, the film manages to be a cut above the competition. Had the editing been more controlled or the characters fleshed out, the film could have been better."

References

External links

The 13 Cold-Blooded Eagles at Hong Kong Cinemagic

1993 films
1993 action films
1993 martial arts films
Hong Kong action films
Hong Kong martial arts films
Wuxia films
Kung fu films
1990s Cantonese-language films
Remakes of Hong Kong films
Hong Kong films about revenge
1993 directorial debut films
1990s Hong Kong films